Maria Consolata Betrone (6 April 1903 – 18 July 1946), baptised as Pierina Maria Betrone, commonly known as Consolata Betrone, was a Catholic mystic and nun of the Franciscan Capuchine order. Betrone was born in Saluzzo, Piedmont, Italy, in a middle-class family. She died at the convent of Moriondo, Testona, Italy.

Consolata Betrone was known for the intense propagation of the rosary, along with reputed apparitions by the Sacred Heart of Jesus and her guardian angel in 1916 during the Feast of the Immaculate Conception. The reputed messages asked for the recitation of: "Jesus, Mary, I love you! Save Souls!", a prayer which Betrone said to release souls from Purgatory and to pardon 1000 blasphemies against the Sacred Heart of Jesus. The pious devotion is very popular among Filipino and Portuguese Catholics, who include invocations in their recitation of the rosary along with the Fatima Prayer.

Life

Pierina Betrone was the daughter of Pietro Betrone and Giuseppina Nirino, the owners of a bakery in Saluzzo (Cuneo) and then managers of a restaurant in Airasco (Turin). Pierina was the second of six daughters born of her father's second marriage. She joined the association of the Company of the Daughters of Mary in parish of San Massimo in Turin. She also became involved in the local Catholic Action group. After a visit to the tomb of Don Bosco in Valsalice, Pierina decided it was time to embark on a religious vocation. Her reading of The Story of a Soul attracted her to Thérèse of Lisieux's "little way".

On 26 January 1925, she joined the Daughters of Mary Help of Christians, but after a little over a year, she became convinced that this was not her calling. She then tried a community founded by Giuseppe Benedetto Cottolengo, but returned to her family in August 1928 and continues her work with the Catholic Action. The superior of the Sisters of the Good Shepherd of Angers suggested that she might join the Franciscans.

On 28 February 1930, Betrone joined the Capuchins in Turin, taking the name Maria Consolata. (The Blessed Virgin Mary is venerated in Turin under the name of Consolata, i.e., Consoler of the Afflicted.) There, she served, among other duties, as cook and concierge. She purportedly experienced interior locutions with Christ.

In 1938, Betrone was assigned to the new monastery of Moriondo (Testona-Turin) not far from the Turin-Genoa railway, which the Capuchins have just opened. In November 1945, Betrone was hospitalized in a sanatorium; her condition being diagnosed as terminal, she returned to the monastery of Moriondo on 3 July 1946.

Consolata Betrone died at the age of forty-three on July 18, 1946. After her death, Lorenzo Sales wrote the book Jesus Appeals to the World based on her reported messages. Betrone is known for her prayer: "Jesus, Mary, I love you: Save souls". Betrone spent her life attempting to bring to perfection this Tiny Way of Love. She used to fight every thought, every word, every emotion, to keep unceasing her "Jesus, Mary, save souls" all day long.

In 1995, Cardinal Giovanni Saldarini started the canonical process of beatification for Maria Consolata Betrone. On April 6, 2019, Pope Francis authorized the Congregation for the Causes of Saints to promulgate the decree recognising the heroic virtues of Betrone giving her the title Venerable. Significantly, April 6 is also the date of her birth.

References

External links 
 Sister Consolata Betrone - official website
 Jesus Appeals to the World: From the Writings of Sr. Consolata Betrone
Venerabili Servi di Dio - Vatican News
Book: The Littlest Way of Love http://www.consolatabetrone-monasterosacrocuore.it/page/ENG/libri/Book_The-Littlest-Way-of-Love.pdf

1903 births
1946 deaths
20th-century Christian mystics
Angelic visionaries
Capuchins
Italian Christian mystics
20th-century Italian Roman Catholic religious sisters and nuns
Roman Catholic mystics
Women mystics
Venerated Catholics by Pope Francis